The 2002 Kroger St. Jude International was a tennis tournament played on indoor hard courts at the Racquet Club of Memphis in Memphis, Tennessee in the United States that was part of the International Series Gold of the 2002 ATP Tour and of Tier III of the 2002 WTA Tour. The tournament ran from February 17 through February 24, 2002. Andy Roddick and Lisa Raymond won the singles titles.

Finals

Men's singles

 Andy Roddick defeated  James Blake 6–4, 3–6, 7–5
 It was Roddick's 1st title of the year and the 5th of his career.

Women's singles

 Lisa Raymond defeated  Alexandra Stevenson 4–6, 6–3, 7–6(11–9)
 It was Raymond's 2nd title of the year and the 33rd of her career.

Men's doubles

 Brian MacPhie /  Nenad Zimonjić defeated  Bob Bryan /  Mike Bryan 6–3, 3–6, [10–4]
 It was MacPhie's only title of the year and the 5th of his career. It was Zimonjić's only title of the year and the 5th of his career.

Women's doubles

 Ai Sugiyama /  Elena Tatarkova defeated  Melissa Middleton /  Brie Rippner 6–4, 2–6, 6–0
 It was Sugiyama's only title of the year and the 24th of her career. It was Tatarkova's only title of the year and the 2nd of her career.

References

External links
 Official website
 ATP Tournament Profile
 WTA Tournament Profile

 
Kroger St. Jude International
Kroger St. Jude International
Kroger St. Jude International
Kroger St. Jude International
Kroger St. Jude International